The Shell Rock River is a  tributary of the West Fork Cedar River in southern Minnesota and northern Iowa in the United States.  Via the Cedar and Iowa rivers, it is part of the Mississippi River watershed.

Name
This river was named for the fossil shells found in outcroppings along its banks. The United States Board on Geographic Names settled on "Shell Rock River" as the stream's name in 1931.  According to the Geographic Names Information System, it has also been known by the spelling "Shellrock River".

Course
The Shell Rock River flows from Albert Lea Lake in Freeborn County, Minnesota, and soon enters Iowa, flowing generally south-southeastwardly through eastern Worth, northeastern Cerro Gordo, western Floyd, northeastern Butler, southwestern Bremer and northwestern Black Hawk counties, past the town of Glenville in Minnesota and the towns of Northwood, Plymouth, Rock Falls, Nora Springs, Rockford, Marble Rock, Greene, Clarksville and Shell Rock in Iowa. At Rockford, Iowa, it collects the Winnebago River from the west.

See also
List of Iowa rivers
List of Minnesota rivers

References

Rivers of Iowa
Rivers of Minnesota
Rivers of Black Hawk County, Iowa
Rivers of Bremer County, Iowa
Rivers of Butler County, Iowa
Rivers of Cerro Gordo County, Iowa
Rivers of Floyd County, Iowa
Rivers of Freeborn County, Minnesota
Rivers of Worth County, Iowa
Tributaries of the Mississippi River